Anna Viktorovna Timofeeva (born 18 July 1987) is a Russian water polo player. She was part of the Russian team at the 2015 World Aquatics Championships. She participated in the 2016 Summer Olympics.

See also
 List of Olympic medalists in water polo (women)
 List of World Aquatics Championships medalists in water polo

References

External links
 

Russian female water polo players
Living people
Place of birth missing (living people)
1987 births
World Aquatics Championships medalists in water polo
Water polo players at the 2016 Summer Olympics
Olympic water polo players of Russia
Olympic bronze medalists for Russia
Olympic medalists in water polo
Medalists at the 2016 Summer Olympics
Universiade medalists in water polo
Universiade bronze medalists for Russia
Medalists at the 2011 Summer Universiade
Water polo players at the 2020 Summer Olympics
Sportspeople from Nizhny Novgorod
21st-century Russian women